MP & Silva Limited was an international sports marketing and media rights firm based in London. Founded in 2004 by Italian businessmen Riccardo Silva and Andrea Radrizzani, the company was primarily involved in the acquisition and international resale of media rights for sporting events. 

At its peak, in 2016, the company was valued around US$1 billion. At this time Riccardo Silva, and his partners including Andrea Radrizzani, sold the company and a majority stake was acquired by two Chinese firms. 

In October 2018, the company was ordered into administration over a multitude of missed rights payments.

History 

MP & Silva began in 2004 with the acquisition of the global rights distribution of selected Italian Serie A football teams. In 2006, the company acquired the rights for the majority of Serie A teams. The first headquarters office opened in Singapore in 2007. By 2009, the company's portfolio principally consisted of media rights of European football leagues being distributed to Asian TV broadcasters. In 2010, MP & Silva headquarters moved to London where they started working with Arsenal. The company acquired the pan-European rights for the French Open in 2011.

In 2013, MP & Silva secured the Premier League's broadcast rights in 51 territories, including the Middle East. The agency also bought Formula One rights in MENA and some selected European countries.

On 20 July 2014 MP & Silva abruptly terminated the broadcast contract with CPBL to distribute Taiwan's professional baseball games in the local media, citing a breach of contract by the league. However, the company did not go into detail what terms of the 6-year, NT$2.04 billion contract – signed just at the beginning of 2014 – were breached. CPBL, in response to the surprise move, maintained that it has not breached any of the terms in the contract and demanded the company to provide an open and clearer explanation of what it called an "ambiguous and unilaterally issued" press statement.

At the beginning of 2015, the company announced its expansion in the United States market and its acquisition of European rights to the National Football League.

In May 2016, Chinese companies Everbright Securities and Beijing Baofeng Technology bought a majority 65% stake of MP & Silva. The purchase was made through a strategic partnership, the Shanghai Jin Xin investment fund.

The company began to face significant struggles under the Chinese majority ownership. In July 2018, it was reported that the company had missed rights payments to entities such as the Premier League (where it held rights in the Asia-Pacific region) and Scottish Professional Football League. Both entities cut their ties with MP & Silva. On 27 July 2018, the Serie A sued MP & Silva over nearly €38 million in unpaid fees. Arsenal F.C. and the International Handball Federation also terminated its contracts with MP & Silva. The French Tennis Federation petitioned in the High Court of Justice for the winding up on MP & Silva under the Insolvency Act 1986.

On 17 October 2018, the High Court ordered the winding-up of MP & Silva.

References

External links
 
 Bloomberg
 Global Sports Industry Summit

Sports companies
Mass media companies established in 2004
Mass media companies disestablished in 2018
Mass media companies based in London